Janice Prishwalko is a fashion model and television hostess based in New York City.

Background 

Prishwalko was born in Clinton, Connecticut and obtained her BA at Boston University.  She currently resides in New York City.

Modeling 

Prishwalko has appeared in numerous print spreads for such magazines as GQ, Glamour, and SELF, and has done catalog and runway work as well.

Television 

Prishwalko is known primarily as the hostess of the video magazine Chic TV, on which she covers the fashion industry.  She has also done hosting for FUJI TV's program Oh My, NY, which airs on Japanese television.

Acting work to date includes commercial work, and bit parts in such programs as Sex and the City and What Not to Wear.

External links 
 http://www.janiceprishwalko.com/
 http://www.chic.tv/

1981 births
Living people
People from Clinton, Connecticut
American female models
Boston University alumni
American women television personalities
21st-century American women
Television personalities from Connecticut